L'Ampolla is a municipality in the comarca of the Baix Ebre in Catalonia, Spain. It was created in 1990 by the division of the municipality of el Perelló.
It is situated on the coast south of l'Ametlla de Mar, and is an important tourist centre and minor fishing port. The town is served by the A-7 autopista, the N-340 coast road and by a station on the RENFE railway line between Tarragona and Valencia.

The GR 92 long distance footpath, which roughly follows the length of the Mediterranean coast of Spain, has a staging point at L'Ampolla.

References

 Panareda Clopés, Josep Maria; Rios Calvet, Jaume; Rabella Vives, Josep Maria (1989). Guia de Catalunya, Barcelona: Caixa de Catalunya.  (Spanish).  (Catalan).

External links
Official website 
 Government data pages 

Municipalities in Baix Ebre
Populated places in Baix Ebre